Callidadelpha bogotana is a species of beetle in the family Carabidae, the only species in the genus Callidadelpha.

References

Lebiinae